North Central Idaho is an area which spans the central part of the state of Idaho and borders Oregon, Montana, and Washington.  It is the southern half of the Idaho Panhandle region and is rich in agriculture and natural resources. Lewis and Clark travelled through this area on their journey to the Pacific Ocean in 1805-06.  The primary cities in this region are Lewiston and Moscow, home of the University of Idaho.

Geography 
North Central Idaho consists of the following counties:

Clearwater
Idaho
Latah
Lewis
Nez Perce

With the exception of the southern portion of Idaho County, this region observes Pacific Time.South of the western-flowing Salmon River, Idaho observes Mountain Time, beginning at Riggins.

Primary cities

Lewiston: inland port on the Snake River, first capital of Idaho Territory in 1863.
Moscow: home of the University of Idaho, established in 1889.

Highways

Federal
 - US-12 - west to Walla Walla, east to  Missoula
 - US-95 - north to Coeur d'Alene, south to southwestern Idaho
 - US-195 - north to Pullman and Spokane

State

Attractions

Lakes 
Dworshak Reservoir – North Fork of Clearwater River

Rivers 

Clearwater
Lochsa
Selway
Palouse
Salmon
Snake

Forests
Clearwater National Forest
Nez Perce National Forest
Payette National Forest

Parks 
McCroskey State Park
Nez Perce National Historical Park
Dworshak State Park
Hells Gate State Park
Winchester State Park

External links
Visit North Central Idaho - travel site
Visit Idaho - official state travel site
 University of Idaho - official site

Regions of Idaho
Geography of Clearwater County, Idaho
Geography of Idaho County, Idaho
Geography of Latah County, Idaho
Geography of Lewis County, Idaho
Geography of Nez Perce County, Idaho